San Francisco, officially the Municipality of San Francisco, is a 1st class municipality in the province of Agusan del Sur, Philippines. According to the 2020 census, it has a population of 80,760 people.

The town serves as the center of trade and commerce in the province of Agusan del Sur. In 2013, San Francisco topped first as the "Most Competitive Municipality in the Philippines in 2012" according to the National Competitiveness Council (NCC) from out of the 163 first-class municipalities covered by their index.

The protected area of the Agusan Marsh Wildlife Sanctuary can also be reached in San Francisco thru the Barangays Caimpugan and New Visayas.

The town is known for the gigantic Toog Tree of Alegria, which is the most sacred tribal tree for many of the indigenous peoples of San Francisco. The town is also popular for its Irosin stone crafts, which has been the cottage industry of many indigenous families in the area for hundreds of years. Due to the town's commendable folk arts and crafts made in stone, many scholars have suggested for its nomination in the UNESCO Creative Cities Network.

The town's name is sometimes colloquially shortened to "San France" or alternately spelled "San Franz" and "San Frans".

History
The birth of San Francisco is associated with the history of Agusan and Surigao del Sur. Before San Francisco became a municipality, it was part of the District of Gibong, which was then governed by Deputy Governor Francisco Cataylo. During this period, the district comprised the barrios of Santa Ana, Caimpugan, Ebro, Borbon, La Caridad, Prosperidad, Azpetea and Los Arcos, with Santa Ana the seat of government. Like other barrios, Santa Ana comprised several sitios, including Sitio Hagpa, which was the site of the present day San Francisco. Hagpa was coined from a Manobo word for "swampy" as the sitio was a small village nestled along the Adlayan River and inhabited by Manobo tribes.

The opening of the Province of Agusan del Sur to most parts of Mindanao came during the government of President Ramon Magsaysay who ordered the first road survey to be conducted by the Department of Highway in 1952. In early 1954, road construction began paving the way for the institution of public land subdivision and the in-migration of different local tribes and settlers from the various provinces of Mindanao, Visayas and Luzon.

Hagpa was later renamed San Francisco in honor of Deputy District Governor Francisco Cataylo. In early 1955, the first local government was established as San Francisco was created as a Municipal District. Francisca Tesoro Samson was appointed as the first Municipal District Mayor by then Provincial Governor Felixberto Dagani. On June 21, 1959, through Republic Act No. 2518, San Francisco was officially created into a regular municipality of the Province of Agusan. In the same year, the first local officials of the municipality were elected with Atty. Paquito Fuentes as the first elected municipal mayor, who served for three consecutive terms of office. He was succeeded by his vice mayor, Cresencio Ausmolo who stayed in office by operation of law during the latter half-portion of his last term.

Eight years after its creation as a regular municipality, on June 17, 1967, through Republic Act No. 4979, the Province of Agusan was divided into the Provinces of Agusan del Norte and Agusan del Sur, in which San Francisco was part of the latter. The continued growth of Agusan del Sur also saw the development of the municipality of San Francisco. Its growing population later paved the way for the creation of the municipality of Rosario through Republic Act No. 5760 approved by President Diosdado Macapagal on June 21, 1969, just two years after the creation of Agusan del Sur. As a result, the several barrios of San Francisco including Bayugan III, Wasi-an, Santa Cruz, Cabawan, Cabantao, Marfil and Tagbayagan were incorporated in the newly created municipality. The barrios of Buenasuerte, Caimpogan, Pasta, Lapinigan, Ebro, New Visayas, Bayugan II, Borbon, Tagapua, Pisaan, Santa Ana, Hubang, Alegria, San Isidro, Das-agan, Ladgadan, Lucac, Bitan-agan and Poblacion consisting of five barrios as stated in PD No. 86 dated December 31, 1972, remained to form part of the 39,253-hectare Municipality of San Francisco. The barrios of Rizal, Ormaca, Mate and Karaos were later created and added to form final 27 barangays of the present day San Francisco.

Geography

According to the Philippine Statistics Authority, the municipality has a land area of  constituting  of the  total area of Agusan del Sur.

Climate

Barangays
San Francisco is politically subdivided into 27 barangays.

Demographics

In the 2020 census, San Francisco had a population of 80,760.

Economy

San Francisco is the "Commercial Capital of Agusan del Sur", serving as the primary commercial and service center in the province of Agusan del Sur. Situated within the crossroad leading to other production centers in the region, San Francisco serves as the primary distribution point of goods and people for the province. The presence of malls, hotels, health institutions, inland resorts, colleges, private/public national, provincial and local offices, restaurants, banks, communication and transportation facilities makes San Francisco the training convention center of the province and a favored place for tourists to stay. Mount Magdiwata also adds boost in its tourism sector.

Transportation
San Francisco have a bus terminal named, San Francisco Transport Terminal. All major buses including Bachelor Express, Davao Metro Shuttle and GO Mindanao bound for Davao, Butuan, Surigao, Tandag and Mangagoy. Philtranco also serve San Francisco, to and from Pasay.

San Francisco also have another public transportation called jeepney and multicab, their destination is Prosperidad, Rosario, Talacogon and Barobo.

Public Utility Van or PUV also served San Francisco, bound for Davao, Butuan, Tandag, Mangagoy and Tagum.

Education

List of public and private educational institutions:

 Agusan del Sur National High School
 Alegria Elementary School
 ACLC College of San Francisco
 Bayugan 2 National High School (formerly Bayugan 2 Integrated School)
 Buenasuerte Elementary School
 Buenasuerte High School
 Bitan-agan Elementary School
 Caimpugan Elementary School
 Bukidnon State University (San Francisco - External Studies Center)
 Das-agan Elementary School 
 D.O. Plaza National High School
 Divine Mercy Play School (Preschool & Kindergarten)
 Enfant Cheri Study Centre 
 Karaos Elementary School
 Ladgadan Elementary school
 Lapinigan Central Elementary School
 Lapinigan National High School
 Light and Life Christian Learning Center (Pre-school & Elementary)
 Mate Elementary School
 Mount Carmel College of San Francisco, Inc. (Kindergarten, Elementary, High School & College)
 New Visayas Elementary School
 Ong Yiu Memorial Elementary School
 Ormaca Elementary School
 Pasta Elementary School
 Pisaan Elementary School
 Saint Francis Xavier College
 San Francisco Colleges (High School & College)
 San Francisco Pilot Central Elementary School (Kindergarten & Elementary)
 San Francisco SDA Elementary School (Kindergarten & Elementary)
 San Francisco SPED Learning Center
 San Francisco West Central Elementary School (Kindergarten & Elementary)
 San Isidro Elementary School
 Southway College of Technology
 Santa Ana Elementary School
 Tagapua Elementary School

References

External links

 [ Philippine Standard Geographic Code]

Municipalities of Agusan del Sur